Baulkham Hills is an electoral district of the Legislative Assembly in the Australian state of New South Wales. It is represented by David Elliott of the Liberal Party.

Baulkham Hills is a 41 km² electorate in Sydney's north-west, taking in the suburbs of Baulkham Hills, Bella Vista and parts of Carlingford, Castle Hill, Kellyville, North Rocks and West Pennant Hills.

The Baulkham Hills electorate was first created in 1991, replacing the short-lived electorate of Carlingford (1988–1991). As with its predecessor, it covers a series of wealthy and largely conservative suburbs. As a result of a redistribution in 2021, Baulkham Hills will be abolished at the 2023 election; its territory split between Castle Hill, Epping and Kellyville.

Members for Baulkham Hills

Election results

References

Electoral districts of New South Wales
1991 establishments in Australia
Constituencies established in 1991
The Hills Shire